Ralph Kirkman Mulford (December 28, 1884  – October 23, 1973) was an American racecar driver who participated in the 1911 Indianapolis 500. In 1911 he won the Vanderbilt Cup in Savannah, Georgia.

Biography
He was born on December 28, 1884, in Brooklyn, New York. He once served as a Sunday school teacher.

There is an ongoing debate that Ralph Mulford, driving a Lozier, may have won the 1911 Indianapolis 500 over Ray Harroun. However, contemporary newspaper accounts and substantiated research, namely by Indianapolis Motor Speedway historian Donald Davidson, have produced no credible evidence to support the claim.

Mulford was retroactively declared the National Driving Champion for 1911 and 1918. He retired from racing on tracks after 1922, but continued to compete for several more years in hill climbs, and – at one time – held the record for both the Mount Washington and Pikes Peak climbs.

He died on October 23, 1973, in Asbury Park, New Jersey. At the time of his death, Mulford was the last surviving participant of the inaugural, 1911 Indianapolis 500.

Indianapolis 500 results

References

External links

 
 Ralph Mulford  at Champ Car Stats
 

1884 births
1973 deaths
Sportspeople from Brooklyn
People from Asbury Park, New Jersey
Racing drivers from New York City
Indianapolis 500 drivers
AAA Championship Car drivers